Conexibacter arvalis  is a Gram-positive, non-spore-forming, short rod-shaped and motile bacterium from the genus of Conexibacter which has been isolated from soil from Saitama prefecture in Japan.

References

 

Actinomycetota
Bacteria described in 2012